Geek Charming is a 2011 Disney Channel Original Movie directed by Jeffrey Hornaday from a screenplay by Elizabeth Hackett and Hilary Galanoy, based on the novel of the same name by Robin Palmer. The film stars Sarah Hyland and Matt Prokop. It premiered on November 11, 2011, on Disney Channel, on January 27, 2012, on Disney Channel (UK & Ireland), and on January 28, 2012 on Disney Channel Asia. The premiere was watched by 4.9 million viewers, the fifth largest number for a cable show of that week.

Plot 

Set in Washington, Dylan Schoenfield is Woodlands Academy's top girl, and her film-geek schoolmate Josh Rosen are two high-school juniors with opposite personalities who meet in the school cafeteria after Josh accidentally spills his lunch on her because she accidentally sprayed him in the face with her perfume. Dylan accidentally drops her fashionable and very expensive handbag into the fountain at the mall after school. She is surprised when Josh retrieves it for her. However, in exchange for him rescuing her bag, Dylan has to agree to be the subject of Josh's documentary, which is about high school popularity. Dylan hopes the film will help her campaign to become "Blossom Queen" and claims that winning is her main goal in life. She and Josh subsequently have a fight though over how much of a diva she is, which results in Josh firing Dylan from his movie. He tries to change the subject of his documentary, but discovers it is too late.

Wanting to make amends with Josh and get re-hired for the movie, Dylan decides to watch Flight of the Navigator with Josh and his friends Ari, Steven and Caitlin. After the movie, Dylan and Josh make up and he re-hires her for his movie. Dylan invites Josh to her house afterwards, where they make an "everything-but-the-kitchen-sink sundae". While Dylan leaves for a while to go get something, Josh notices a wall of pictures, one of which has Dylan's mom in it, crowned the Blossom Queen. When Dylan comes back he asks her about it, and she says that her mom was Blossom Queen back in 1985. She had died when Dylan was eight. She also admits that she will feel more connected to her mom if she wins Blossom Queen, as her mom had.

As Dylan and Josh begin to fall for each other, Josh's friends from the film club are angry at him for abandoning them for Dylan, and assume he has a crush, which Josh denies. He promises to attend the Mathlete Scavenger hunt the following Saturday. Dylan allows Josh to enter "the ramp," the place in the cafeteria where the popular students sit, as a friend rather than a filmmaker. She advises Josh to talk to Amy, so he leaves, replaced by a disgruntled Asher (Dylan's boyfriend). Meanwhile, Josh lands a date with Amy, and she says that Saturday is her day off. Forgetting that Saturday is the day of the scavenger hunt, he agreed. After that, Josh talks to Dylan, not knowing where to take Amy on a date (and still forgetting about the scavenger hunt), so Dylan invites him to a party at Asher's house. Josh picks up Amy the next day and takes her to the party, even though Amy is uncomfortable with the crowd. Josh realizes that he and Amy have a lot less in common than he originally thought, and she leaves to check out the music. Josh talks to Dylan and asks her for advice on how to interact with Amy, as he had never dated anyone before. Asher and Amy catch them talking and Asher assumes they're secretly dating. After the party, Josh asks Amy out to the spring formal. Amy declines, stating that although Josh is not secretly dating Dylan, he wants to.

The next day before Dylan goes to school, her contacts fall down the sink, so she wears her nerdy black-and-brown glasses, which nobody knows she wears. At first she tries her best to make do without them, but when she gets a note in class from Asher, she puts them on to read it, revealing her secret. To add insult to injury, the note says that Asher is breaking up with her. Asher is seeing Dylan change and she is hanging out with nerds and starting to look like one. At lunch she wants Josh to sit with her, but Josh refuses since his movie is not done and he needs to stay focus and Dylan threatens him. Josh counters, saying, "Or what? You're gonna ban me from the ramp? Your seat has already been taken!" Asher, now her ex-boyfriend, had given her chair to her biggest rival, Nicole Patterson, who is also a candidate for Blossom Queen. Dylan walks off again silently crying. Josh asks his friends what's wrong with Dylan. Upon hearing that Asher just broke up with her, Josh feels guilty. He also gets the news that he has been replaced by Caitlin as the film club president. To make matters worse for Dylan, Hannah and Lola, her entourage, also bail on her because they both have dates to the formal and Dylan doesn't, as Asher broke up with her for Nicole. Josh finishes his movie, after much delay, and shows it to the public. Dylan walks into the premiere and sits down. She expects the movie to help her win Blossom Queen, but she is totally disgusted with the movie after only seeing a bit of it. When the audience laughs at Dylan's shallow behavior towards the beginning of Josh's film, dubbed "The Popularity Project", Dylan runs out of the theater crying as Josh runs after her. Dylan accuses Josh of publicly humiliating her and undoing all her efforts to be rid of her old self and walks off after telling him to leave her alone. It is revealed that the movie actually contains a compliment to Dylan at the end that Dylan didn't see.

The next morning, Amy shows up at Dylan's house. She states that just because Dylan stopped being friends with her in sixth grade, Amy never stopped being her friend. She figured Dylan's decisions were affected by the death of her mother. She then tells her that Josh is worried about her, that the film won the film festival, and that she is more popular than ever. She gives Dylan a DVD of Josh's "terrible" film and tells her to watch all of it before she decides that her social life is ruined.

Later at the Spring Formal, Dylan shows up wearing her mother's dress, where Lola and Hannah ambush her, pulling her from Amy. Dylan wins the title of Blossom Queen like her mother did, much to Dylan's amazement and Nicole's horror and anger, as she storms off of the stage. Dylan then proceeds with a tearful impromptu apology for much of what she said in the film, and declares her feelings for Josh. She mentions her appreciation towards Amy for being her friend and thanks Josh. They share a kiss and begin to dance; Josh and Dylan are finally together. In the end, Dylan and Josh are shown facing the camera and apologizing for the names they called each other at first. They kiss again with Josh's jacket covering their faces.

Cast 

 Sarah Hyland as Dylan Schoenfield, the snobby, wealthy, popular girl at school who is a reformed dork, who initially aims to (and eventually does) win the Blossom Queen status, following in her late mother's footsteps; also Josh's love interest.
 Matt Prokop as Josh Rosen, the film geek at school who wants to take on a challenge to film a documentary on popularity, which seems impossible, as he, himself, is anything but popular; Dylan's love interest.
 Sasha Pieterse as Amy Loubalu, Dylan's ex-best friend and Josh's original love interest. Amy and Dylan do however reconnect in the end.
 Jordan Jedediah Nichols as Asher Dumentz, Dylan's popular boyfriend/ex-boyfriend.
 Vanessa Morgan as Hannah Mornell, Dylan's best friend who can sometimes be sweeter than Lola by nature. Hannah is described as extremely intelligent in the book and wants to get into a decent college, making her a bit of a nerd herself.
 Lili Simmons as Lola Leighton, Dylan's other best friend. Although extremely loyal to Dylan, she thinks Dylan is just a drama queen who stresses too much.
 David Del Rio as Ari, Josh's friend.
 Jimmy Bellinger as Steven, Josh's other friend.
 Lilli Birdsell as Sandy Rosen, Josh's mother.
 Andrew Airlie as Alan Schoenfield, Dylan's father.
 Kacey Rohl as Caitlin Raven, Josh's friend who has a crush on him and Steven's love interest.
 Andrea Brooks as Nicole Patterson, Dylan's rival/arch enemy for Blossom Queen. The head cheerleader at Woodlands Academy, she lands Asher from Dylan and thinks that Dylan is no match for her popularity.

Songs 
"Hey Princess" by Allstar Weekend
"Words" by Doves
"The William Tell Overture Theme Music" by The Orchestral Academy Band Of Los Angeles California

Production 

Robin Palmer, the author of the original novel, was not involved in production and refused to read the script due to her background of adapting novels into films.
The movie was shot in Vancouver, Canada and at St. George's School. The final scene was filmed near Broadway Ave.

Reception 
It premiered on Friday, November 11, 2011, on Disney Channel and earned 4.910 million viewers.

Home media 
The film was released on DVD in the USA on February 7, 2012. It features 10 bonus episodes of Shake It Up and is a 2-disc set.

The film was released in the UK on April 23, 2012, alongside Frenemies. There are 5 episodes of Shake It Up and 5 episodes of So Random, on a 2-disc set. The bonus features are:
Bloopers
Deleted Scenes
Extended Ending
"From Geek to Chic" (featurette)
5 Bonus Episodes of So Random! (featuring Tony Hawk, Lemonade Mouth, Miss Piggy, Jacob Latimore and Justin Bieber)
5 Bonus Episodes of Shake It Up ("Shake It Up Up and Away", "Shrink It Up", "Auction It Up", "Camp It Up" and "Jingle It Up")

References

External links 

 
 Interview with Sarah Hyland

2011 comedy-drama films
2011 television films
2011 films
2011 romantic comedy-drama films
2010s high school films
2010s teen comedy-drama films
2010s teen romance films
American comedy-drama television films
American high school films
American romantic comedy-drama films
American teen comedy-drama films
American teen romance films
Disney Channel Original Movie films
Films about filmmaking
Films based on American novels
Films directed by Jeffrey Hornaday
Films scored by Nathan Wang
Films set in Washington (state)
Films shot in Vancouver
Mandeville Films films
Romance television films
Television films based on books
2010s American films